Phthinocola is a genus of moths belonging to the family Tineidae.

This genus contains only one species: Phthinocola dochmia Meyrick, 1886 that is found in Tonga. It has a wingspan of 9mm.

References

Tineidae
Tineidae genera
Monotypic moth genera
Taxa named by Edward Meyrick